Neil McGee (born 13 November 1985) is an Irish Gaelic footballer who plays for Gaoth Dobhair and, formerly, both the Donegal county team and the Ireland international rules football team.

From Gweedore in County Donegal, he won three All Stars, one All-Ireland Senior Football Championship, five Ulster Senior Football Championships and one National Football League with his county, an Ulster Senior Club Football Championship with his club and two International Rules Series with his country.

Playing career

Club
In 2006, his club were back in the final of the Donegal Senior Football Championship. He played as his team won their 1st County Championship in one of the worst Donegal county finals ever.

In 2018 he was on the Gaoth Dobhair team that made those videos in the pub after they won Ulster in which they called out their All-Ireland Semi-Final opponents, Corofin. Corofin did not respond leading many observers to conclude that they were hiding in their wagon and shiteing in a bucket, as alleged by McGee. However, this was confirmed not to be true as corofin went on to beat gaoth dobhair in the all Ireland semi final

Inter-county
Brian McEniff gave McGee his Donegal senior debut against Fermanagh in the 2005 Dr McKenna Cup on 2 January 2005. He played in the 2006 Ulster Senior Football Championship Final at Croke Park.

McGee was part of the Donegal senior team that won the county's first National Football League against Mayo in 2007. It was the first piece of silverware the county senior team had lifted since 1992.

In Jim McGuinness's first game in charge of Donegal, a drab 2011 National Football League draw with the perennially underachieving Sligo, McGee pulled a hamstring, was moved to the full-forward line and scored a goal in the latest manifestation of Sligo's notorious inability to succeed. McGee was out injured for four weeks after that game but when he returned he established himself as Donegal's first-choice full-back in the team's march towards the 2012 All-Ireland Senior Football Championship Final. Donegal won.

He scored a goal against Sligo in the 2011 National League.

In 2011, McGee won his first All Star award. He added another in 2012.

He also won his first Ulster SFC in 2011. This was followed by his second in 2012. He attended the Football Tour of New York.

In 2013, McGee made his 100th appearance for Donegal in the county's opening National Football League against Kildare at Croke Park, becoming the sixth footballer then playing for the team to reach that mark following Christy Toye, Colm McFadden, Rory Kavanagh, Karl Lacey and McGee's own brother Eamon (they were also the first set of brothers to ever reach 100 Donegal appearances).

He won his third Ulster SFC in 2014.

In 2016, he lost his appeal against the red card and a subsequent two-match ban picked up in the Ulster Championship quarter-final win over Fermanagh.

Two years later, he lost his appeal against the red card he picked up for an alleged knee up the back of an opponent in the Ulster SFC semi-final win over Down. Thus he missed Donegal's 2018 Ulster Senior Football Championship final victory over Fermanagh.

He equalled Colm McFadden's record of 173 appearances for Donegal when he came on as a second half substitute in the final round of the 2019 National Football League, a victory over Kildare. He then broke McFadden's record with his 174th appearance for his county against Meath as a substitute in the final at Croke Park, also won by Donegal.

He won his fifth Ulster SFC in 2019.

Shortly before his 37th birthday, and with a record 195 appearances for the team, McGee announced his retirement from inter-county football in an exclusive interview given to Frank Craig and published in the Donegal News on 29 September 2022.

Inter-provincial
McGee played for Ulster in the Inter-Provincial Series.

International rules
McGee thrice represented Ireland against Australia in the International Rules Series: in 2011, 2013 and 2014. Ireland won the first two and lost the third. According to Eoin Liston, who has worked with any of the Irish teams, McGee was "tailor-made" for international rules football.

Honours
Donegal
 All-Ireland Senior Football Championship: 2012
 Ulster Senior Football Championship: 2011, 2012, 2014, 2018, 2019
 National Football League Division 1: 2007
 National Football League Division 2: 2011, 2019
 Dr McKenna Cup: 2010

Gaoth Dobhair
 Ulster Senior Club Football Championship: 2018
 Donegal Senior Football Championship: 2002, 2006, 2018

Ulster
 Railway Cup: 2012

Colleges 
 Sigerson Cup: 2004

Ireland
 International Rules Series: 2011, 2013
 Runner-up: 2014

Individual
 All Star: 2011, 2012, 2014
 Irish News Ulster All-Star: 2011, 2012
 The Sunday Game Team of the Year: 2012

References

External links
 Official profile
 
 Neil McGee at gaainfo.com

1985 births
Living people
Donegal inter-county Gaelic footballers
Gaelic football backs
Gaoth Dobhair Gaelic footballers
Irish international rules football players
Ulster inter-provincial Gaelic footballers
Winners of one All-Ireland medal (Gaelic football)